Barrio Obrero is a barrio (neighbourhood) of Asunción, the capital of Paraguay. It has a population of 19,823 people. The name of this barrio comes from the word "worker" (obrero) in reference to the humble and working class people who form the majority of the population.

Barrio Obrero is famous for its Quinta Avenida (the Fifth Avenue) where several small bars, restaurants, shops and casinos are located. The neighbourhood is also known as the home of several important and traditional football and sport clubs such as Cerro Porteño, Nacional, Sol de América and Club Atlántida.

References 

Neighbourhoods of Asunción